Ovothiol A (N1-methyl-4-mercaptohistidine) is a highly reducing antioxidant mercaptohistidine, which accumulates to very high levels in the eggs of certain marine invertebrates, including sea urchins, scallops and starfish, where it acts to scavenge hydrogen peroxide released during fertilization.

This thiol is also found in some human pathogens including trypanosomes and members of the genus Leishmania.

It is synthesized by the addition and oxidation of cysteine to histidine by 5-histidylcysteine sulfoxide synthase, followed by methylation and further reduction.

References

Thiols
Amino acids
Imidazoles